The Ministry of Foreign Affairs and Foreign Trade of Barbados is a key Barbadian government agency responsible for regulating, maintaining, and developing Barbados's external relations and the nature of trading with foreign countries. The Ministry is also responsible for the country's representation at the United Nations and advises other Ministries and State authorities when the latter have dealings with foreign governments or institutions.  It is based on Culloden Road, in the nation's capital Bridgetown.

List
The following is a list of foreign ministers of Barbados since 1966:

See also
 List of ambassadors and high commissioners to and from Barbados
 Cabinet of Barbados
 List of prime ministers of Barbados
 List of current foreign ministers
 List of current permanent representatives to the United Nations (Barbadian representatives)
 Barbados v. Trinidad and Tobago

References

Barbados, eDiplomat
Procedures For The Accreditation of Ambassadors to Barbados

External links
Ministry of Foreign Affairs, Foreign Trade and International Business official website

Foreign Affairs
Barbados
 
Foreign Affairs, Foreign Trade and International Business
Foreign Affairs
Barbados diplomacy-related lists